Logicalis is a United Kingdom-based information and communications technology (ICT) infrastructure and service provider. The company is owned by Johannesburg, South Africa-based multinational ICT solutions and services group Datatec.

History
Logicalis’s origins go back to 1997 when Datatec acquired Logical Networks plc, a UK based networking integrator (a company that had been established since 1988). From 1997 to 2000, Datatec embarked on a globalisation strategy, acquiring more than 20 IT integration and services companies across Europe, North and South America and Australasia.

In 2001, Logicalis Group, which is 100% owned by Datatec, became the formal statutory holding company of the Logicalis operating companies.

In 2003, Logicalis received an unsolicited offer from IBM for the Group's Australian and New Zealand businesses. The disposal was concluded in March 2004. Since then, Logicalis has continued to acquire companies throughout Europe, North and South America, and Asia Pacific, focusing on IT integration solutions and network and enterprise systems.

Recognition
The US operation was ranked 24th in the CRN Magazine 2011 VAR 500.

References

Technology companies established in 1997
Companies based in Slough
1997 establishments in England